Many math competitions in the United States have regional restrictions.  Of these, most are statewide.

For a more complete list, please visit here .

The contests include:

Alabama
 Alabama Statewide High School Mathematics Contest
 Virgil Grissom High School Math Tournament
 Vestavia Hills High School Math Tournament

Arizona
 Great Plains Math League
 AATM State High School Contest

California
 Bay Area Math Olympiad
 Lawrence Livermore National Laboratories Annual High School Math Challenge
 Cal Poly Math Contest and Trimathlon 
 Polya Competition
 Bay Area Math Meet
 College of Creative Studies Math Competition
 LA Math Cup 
 Math Day at the Beach hosted by CSULB
 Math Field Day for San Diego Middle Schools
 Mesa Day Math Contest at UC Berkeley
 Santa Barbara County Math Superbowl
 Pomona College Mathematical Talent Search
 Redwood Empire Mathematics Tournament hosted by Humboldt State (middle and high school)
 San Diego Math League and San Diego Math Olympiad hosted by the San Diego Math Circle
 Santa Clara University High School Mathematics Contest
 Stanford Mathematics Tournament
 UCSD/GSDMC High School Honors Mathematics Contest

Colorado
 Colorado Mathematics Olympiad

District of Columbia
Moody's Mega Math

Florida
 Florida-Stuyvesant Alumni Mathematics Competition
 David Essner Mathematics Competition
 James S. Rickards High School Fall Invitational
 FAMAT Regional Competitions:
 January Regional
 February Regional
 March Regional
 FGCU Math Competition

Georgia
Central Math Meet(grades 9 - 12)
 GA Council of Teachers of Mathematics State Varsity Math Tournament
STEM Olympiads Of America  Math, Science & Cyber Olympiads (grades 3 - 8)
Valdosta State University Middle Grades Mathematics Competition

Illinois
ICTM math contest (grades 3–12)

Indiana
[IUPUI High School Math Contest] (grades 9–12)
Huntington University Math Competition (grades 6–12)
Indiana Math League
IASP Academic Super Bowl
Rose-Hulman High School Mathematics Contest (grades 9–12)
 Trine University Math Competition

Iowa
 Great Plains Math League

Kansas
 Great Plains Math League

Louisiana
 Louisiana State University Mathematics Contest for high school students

Maine
 Pi-Cone South Math League
 Maine Association of Math Leagues

Maryland
The University of Maryland High School Mathematics Competition
The Eastern Shore High School Mathematics Competition
Maryland Trig-Star
Maryland Math League
JHU Math Competition
Montgomery Blair Math Tournament

Massachusetts
 Harvard–MIT Mathematics Tournament
 Worcester Polytechnic Institute Mathematics Meet
 Massachusetts Mathematics Olympiad
 Greater Boston Mathematics League
 Massachusetts Mathematics League
 Southeastern Massachusetts Mathematics League
 Southern Massachusetts Conference Mathematics League
 Western Massachusetts Mathematics League
 Worcester County Mathematics League
 Intermediate Math League of Eastern Massachusetts
 Lexington Mathematics Tournament
 Winchester Mathematics Competition

Michigan
 Lower Michigan Mathematics Competition (college)
 Michigan Autumn Take Home (college)
 Michigan Mathematics Prize Competition (high school)

Minnesota
 Minnesota State High School Math League
 St. Cloud State University Math Competition

Missouri
 KCATM Math Contests (grades 3–12)
 Missouri Council of Teachers of Mathematics Math Contests (grades 4–12)
 Great Plains Math League

New Jersey
 WWPMT (West Windsor-Plainsboro Math Tournament) (grades 3–8)

New York
 Nassau County Interscholastic Mathematics League
 New York City Interscholastic Mathematics League
 New York State Mathematics League
 New York Math League
 Suffolk County Math Tournament

North Carolina
 Duke University Math Math Meet
 North Carolina State High School Math Contest

Ohio

 Ohio Council of Teachers of Mathematics (OCTM) State Contest
 Ohio Mathematics Invitational Olympiad (OHMIO)

Oklahoma
 OSU High School Math Contest

Pennsylvania
 Lehigh University/AT&T High School Math Contest

Rhode Island
 Rhode Island Math League

South Carolina

 Clemson Calculus Challenge
 Coastal Carolina University Math Competition
 College of Charleston Math Meet
 Florence-Darlington Tech Math Competition
 Furman University Wylie Mathematics Tournament
 Pee-Dee Regional High-School Mathematics Tournament 
 University of South Carolina High School Math Contest
 USC Aiken Math Competition
 USC Upstate Math Competition
 Wando High Mu Alpha Theta Tournament

Texas
 Rice Mathematics Tournament
 Texas A&M University Mathematics Tournament
 Texas Academy of Mathematics and Science Tournament

Utah
 Utah Math Olympiad
 Utah State Math Contest
 Snow College Math Contest
 Intermountain Math Competition

Virginia
Christopher Newport University Regional High School Mathematics

Washington
Washington State Math Championship
Northwest Math Championship
Math is Cool Championships
Math is Cool Masters
Mount Rainier Mathematics Invitational
Washington State Mu Alpha Theta
Knights of Pi Math Tournament (KPMT)
Interlake Invitational Math Contest (I2MC)
WSMA Math Bowl

Wisconsin
 Wisconsin Mathematics, Engineering, and Science Talent Search

West Virginia

 West Virginia State Math Field Day

Mathematics competitions
Mathematics-related lists